Oyster Point Pharma, Inc. is an American biopharmaceutical based in Princeton, New Jersey, focusing on the development of pharmaceutical therapies to treat ophthalmic diseases.

Products
The lead product of the company is Tyrvaya. In October 2021, it was the first nasal spray approved by Food and Drug Administration to treat dry eye syndrome.

Initial public offering and stock history
Prior to going public, Oyster Point Pharma operated at a loss of $16.5 million in 2018. In February 2019, still at clinical stage, the company raised $93 million in its Series B funding round.

In October 2019, the company issued 5-million shares in the initial public offering with NASDAQ Global Select Market at the price of $16 per share with the first trading day on October 31.

References

External links
 

Companies listed on the Nasdaq
Biotechnology companies of the United States
Pharmaceutical companies based in New Jersey
Companies based in Princeton, New Jersey
Companies established in 2015